Salix glaucosericea, common name silky willow or Alpine grey willow, is a species of flowering plant in the Salicaceae family. Some authorities consider it a synonym of Salix glauca var. villosa, which is found in western North America.

Description
This plant usually develop into a large shrub. The yellow-green, simple leaves are lanceolate, entire and petiolate. Like all willows this species is dioecious. Flowers bloom from June to July.

Distribution
It is present in mountains of Europe (France, Switzerland, Austria, Italy and the Alps).

Habitat

References

Pignatti S. - Flora d'Italia (3 voll.) - Edagricole – 1982
Christoper Brickell (Editor-in-chief): RHS A-Z Encyclopedia of Garden Plants. Third edition. Dorling Kindersley, London 2003

External links
Biolib
Hortipedia
Luirig.altervista
Homolaicus
Alpine Flowers

glaucosericea